Carisa Hendrix is a Canada-based magician and fire eater who often performs in the persona of Lucy Darling.

Early life 
Hendrix was born in Prince Albert, Saskatchewan and grew up in Calgary where she is currently based. She was a former art student and model.

Performing career 
She was the subject of the 2016 Super Channel documentary Girl on Fire. 

She has been profiled in major press numerous times on the rise of ‘the female magician”  because the field of magic has historically been male-dominated and female magicians are considered “extremely rare.”

She has been featured repeatedly at the Melbourne Magic Festival.

She was named artist-in-residence at the Chicago Magic Lounge for 2019.

She is a regular performer at The Magic Castle, in Hollywood, California, where she performs as “Lucy Darling,” a sharp-tongued magician character she partly bases on Dorothy Parker.

Awards and recognition 
In 2012, she set the Guinness World Record for how long she could hold a lit torch in her mouth, a feat that was featured in both the Guinness Book of World Records in 2014, and Ripley's Believe it or Not in 2015.

In 2017, Hendrix won the Melbourne International Comedy Festival Award, the Award for Best Comedy Show at The Melbourne Magic Festival, and in 2019 won the Allan Slaight Foundation’s Canadian Rising Star Award.

References

External links

Lucy Darling Website

Living people
Female magicians
People from Prince Albert, Saskatchewan
Canadian magicians
Canadian stunt performers
Year of birth missing (living people)
Academy of Magical Arts Stage Magician of the Year winners